Egerton Hubbard, 2nd Baron Addington VD (29 December 1842 – 14 June 1915) was a British Peer.
He was Member of Parliament for Buckinghamshire from 1874 to 1880, and from 1886 to 1889.

Life and career

The son of John Gellibrand Hubbard, 1st Baron Addington, he succeeded the Barony on the death of his father. He held the office of High Steward of Buckingham.

He was educated at Radley College, and graduated from Christ Church, Oxford, with a First B.A. in 1865, and with an M.A. in 1866.
In 1863, he was commissioned into the 3rd Buckinghamshire Rifle Volunteer Corps (after 1875 amalgamated into the 1st Buckinghamshire Rifle Volunteers). He was promoted Lieutenant in 1871, Captain in 1887, Major and Lieutenant-Colonel in 1890, and Colonel in 1895. He resigned his commission in February 1900.

Family
He married Mary Adelaide Portal, daughter of Sir Wyndham Portal, 1st Baronet, on 3 June 1880, and they had the following children:
Winifred Mary Hubbard (1881–1968)
John Gellibrand Hubbard, 3rd Baron Addington (1883–1966)
Raymond Egerton Hubbard, 4th Baron Addington (1884–1971)
Francis Spencer Hubbard (1888–1963)
Ruth Mary Hubbard (1896–1955)

Arms

References

External links 

1842 births
1915 deaths
Oxfordshire and Buckinghamshire Light Infantry officers
Hubbard, Egerton
Hubbard, Egerton
Hubbard, Egerton
UK MPs who inherited peerages
Hubbard, Egerton
Egerton